Quiet Kill, also known as Nightmare Boulevard, is a 2004 film directed by Mark Jones. It stars Corbin Bernsen and Claudia Christian.

Cast
Corbin Bernsen as Jerry Martin
Claudia Christian as Amy Martin
Ron Perlman as Detective Sergeant Perry
James Van Patten as Detective Jackson
Vanessa Lee Evigan as Milly Martin

References

External links

2004 films
2000s English-language films
Films directed by Mark Jones